Arturo Pérez Torres is a Mexican-born Canadian film director and screenwriter. He is most noted for his 2017 film The Drawer Boy, for which he received a Canadian Screen Award nomination for Best Adapted Screenplay at the 7th Canadian Screen Awards in 2019.

Born and raised in Mexico City, he studied film at San Francisco State University and sociology at the University of Amsterdam, and worked in advertising as an art director until moving to Canada in 2003. He became a Canadian citizen in 2007, and won a Guggenheim Fellowship in 2009. He directed several documentary films before releasing The Drawer Boy, his first narrative feature film, in 2017.

He is married to Aviva Armour-Ostroff, his codirector of both The Drawer Boy and Lune.

Filmography
Wetback: The Undocumented Documentary - 2005
Super Amigos - 2007
City Idol - 2007
Las águilas humanas - 2010
Proyecto Nº 945 - 2013
The Drawer Boy - 2017, with Aviva Armour-Ostroff
Lune - 2021, with Aviva Armour-Ostroff

References

External links

21st-century Canadian screenwriters
21st-century Canadian male writers
21st-century Mexican writers
Canadian documentary film directors
Mexican documentary film directors
Mexican screenwriters
Mexican emigrants to Canada
Living people
Year of birth missing (living people)